Several ports were briefly named Port Napoleon during Napoleon's reign in France.

Port-Saint-Louis-du-Rhône
Between 1803 and 1810, Port Louis, the capital of Mauritius, was known as Port Napoleon.